Gourde may refer to:
 Haitian gourde, the currency of Haiti
 Gaston Gourde, a politician with the Liberal Party of Canada 
 Jacques Gourde, a politician of the Conservative Party of Canada 
 Yanni Gourde, a Canadian ice hockey player

See also
 Gourd, a plant of the family Cucurbitaceae.